Helena Dalli (born Helena Abela, 29 September 1962) is a Maltese politician serving as European Commissioner for Equality since 1 December 2019. She is a member of the Labour Party.

Career

Parliamentary Secretary 

In 1996, Dalli was elected to the Parliament of Malta and appointed Parliamentary Secretary for Women's Rights in the Office of the Prime Minister. She was re-elected during the five subsequent elections, making her the second most elected woman in Maltese political history.

During her two-year tenure, she put forwards a Childcare Bill to provide for regulations of childcare services both in the public and the private sector, and took care of the drafting of the Gender Equality Bill with the assistance of the United Nations Development Programme. Dalli also launched Malta's first white paper on domestic violence.

Minister 

During the 2013-2017 legislature, Dr Dalli was Minister for Social Dialogue, Consumer Affairs and Civil Liberties. Under her direction, the Maltese Government introduced several laws and policies to strengthen the equality and human rights framework, including a Civil Unions Act as well as the widening of the anti-discrimination protections in the Maltese constitution to cover the grounds of gender identity and sexual orientation.

In April 2015, she presented a law establishing wide-ranging rights for transgender and intersex people. The Gender Identity Gender Expression and Sex Characteristics Act provides for a right to gender identity and the recognition of one's self-determined gender on official documents, and recognises a right to bodily integrity and physical autonomy.

During the same legislature, Dalli introduced a national maternity leave fund to which all employers contribute regardless of the gender of their employees, in order to protect women against discrimination during the recruitment process.

In 2015, Helena Dalli led the process for the establishment of the International Day of Women and Girls in Science, which the UN now commemorates annually on 11 February. Dalli was also instrumental for the restructuring of the Malta Medicines Authority.

Dalli was re-elected from two districts in the 2017 general election. At the start of the new session, she presented  to Parliament  a Bill to introduce marriage equality (same-sex marriage). Dalli's work in the equality sector led Malta to become the country affording the best legal protection and equality for LGBTIQ people. As a result, Malta has retained the top spot of the ILGA-Europe country index for four consecutive years.

During both terms as a Minister, Dalli worked to enhance Malta's human rights and equality structures and their independence, as well as dialogue with civil society and social partners. In view of this, she set up a Human Rights and Equality Directorate that is responsible for Government policy on gender equality and gender mainstreaming, LGBTIQ equality, and migrant integration and anti-racism. She also set up an LGBTIQ Consultative Council, a Consultative Council for Women's Rights and a Forum on Integration Affairs. Following a long and multi-step consultation process, she presented an Equality Bill and a Human Rights and Equality Commission Bill that aim to instil the highest standards in terms of anti-discrimination and equality in all spheres of life, and the setting up of an independent national human rights institution in line with the Paris Principles of the United Nations and European Union equality directives.

Following the 2019 European elections, Dalli was nominated by the government of Prime Minister Muscat as Malta's candidate for the subsequent European Commission.

Commissioner 
In 2019, Dalli was made the European Commissioner for Equality in the von der Leyen Commission. Her Portfolio included leading on EU implementation of the UN Convention on the Rights of Persons with Disabilities, developing a European 'gender strategy' to further improve women's rights by improving pay transparency and ensuring implementation of the Women on Boards Directive, ensuring implementation of the Work-Life Balance Directive, exploring the addition of 'violence against women' to the list of EU crimes and supporting EU accession to the Istanbul Convention. 

In November 2021, Dalli launched internal EU guidelines for inclusive language, including saying "holiday season" instead of Christmas, avoiding gendered phrases such as "ladies and gentlemen", and to use names such as "Malika and Julio" for fictional people rather than "Maria and John". The guidelines were criticised by politicians including Antonio Tajani of Forza Italia and former Democratic Party Prime Minister of Italy Matteo Renzi, and were eventually withdrawn. Pope Francis compared the measures to anti-Christian dictatorships in revolutionary France, Nazi Germany and the communist world.

In the same month, French ministers Marlène Schiappa and Clément Beaune criticised Dalli for meeting representatives of FEMYSO, a youth group that France considers to be linked to the Muslim Brotherhood.

Academia 

Dalli holds a PhD in Political Sociology from the University of Nottingham, and lectures in Economic and Political Sociology, Public Policy, and Sociology of Law at the University of Malta.

Recognition 

In 2016, Dalli was the first Maltese nominee and winner of the European Diversity Award for her work in human rights and equality at the local and international level.

In 2019, Dalli was presented, on behalf of Malta, with the Diversa Internacional award by the Spanish Association of Lawyers and Lawyers against Hate Crimes, in recognition of her work for equality on both the domestic and international fronts.

In 2021, Dalli was presented an award by the Spanish Government in recognition of the robustness of the EU LGBTIQ Equality Strategy 2020-2025. Months later, she received an award on behalf of the European Commission from PROUD, an organisation working for LGBTIQ equality in Czechia, for the same strategy.

Literature 
Uwe Jens Rudolf: Historical Dictionary of Malta, 3rd edition, Rowman & Littlefield 2018, page 75 (Online)

Notes

External links

 Helena Dalli at the Malta Parliament
 The Minister
 

20th-century Maltese women politicians
20th-century Maltese politicians
21st-century Maltese women politicians
21st-century Maltese politicians
Government ministers of Malta
Labour Party (Malta) MEPs
Living people
Maltese beauty pageant winners

Maltese film actresses
Members of the House of Representatives of Malta
Miss World 1979 delegates

Women government ministers of Malta
1962 births
European Commissioners 2019–2024
Beauty queen-politicians
Maltese women
Maltese European Commissioners